Klaus Porbadnik (born 24 June 1930) is a German long-distance runner. He competed in the marathon at the 1956 Summer Olympics.

References

External links
 

1930 births
Living people
Athletes (track and field) at the 1956 Summer Olympics
German male long-distance runners
German male marathon runners
Olympic athletes of the United Team of Germany
Sportspeople from Warmian-Masurian Voivodeship
People from Olsztynek
People from East Prussia
20th-century German people
21st-century German people